Star Wars: Episode I – The Phantom Menace is a 1999 American epic space opera film written and directed by George Lucas. It stars Liam Neeson, Ewan McGregor, Natalie Portman, Jake Lloyd, Ahmed Best, Ian McDiarmid, Anthony Daniels, Kenny Baker, Pernilla August, and Frank Oz. It is the fourth film in the Star Wars film series, the first film of the prequel trilogy and the first chronological chapter of the "Skywalker Saga". Set 32 years before the original trilogy, during the era of the Galactic Republic, the plot follows Jedi Master Qui-Gon Jinn and his apprentice Obi-Wan Kenobi as they try to protect Queen Padmé Amidala of Naboo in hopes of securing a peaceful end to an interplanetary trade dispute. Joined by Anakin Skywalker—a young slave with unusually strong natural powers of the Force—they simultaneously contend with the mysterious return of the Sith. The film was produced by Lucasfilm, with 20th Century Fox distributing.

Following the release of Return of the Jedi (1983), talks of a follow-up were proposed, but Lucas was unmotivated to return to the franchise. During the hiatus, the backstories he created for the characters, particularly Anakin's own backstory, sparked interest in him to develop a prequel trilogy during the 1990s. After he determined that computer-generated imagery (CGI) had advanced to the level he wanted for the prequel trilogy's visual effects, Lucas began writing The Phantom Menace in 1993, and production began in 1994. Filming started on June 26, 1997—at locations including Leavesden Film Studios and the Tunisian desert—and ended on September 30.  The film marked Lucas' first directorial effort after a 22-year hiatus following the original Star Wars in 1977.

The Phantom Menace was released in theaters on May 19, 1999, almost 16 years after the premiere of Return of the Jedi. The film's premiere was extensively covered by media and was widely anticipated because of the large cultural following the Star Wars saga had cultivated. Upon its release, The Phantom Menace received mixed reviews. While the visual effects, action sequences, musical score, and the performances of Neeson and McGregor were praised, criticism was largely focused on the screenplay, pacing, Lloyd's performance, and characters, with Jar Jar Binks in particular receiving extremely negative reception. Furthermore, the film's blend of complicated, politics-heavy storytelling and juvenile humor was perceived as incongruent. Despite the mixed reception, The Phantom Menace was a box-office success and broke numerous box-office records during its debut. It grossed more than $924.3 million worldwide during its initial theatrical run, becoming the highest-grossing film of 1999, the second-highest-grossing film worldwide and in North America (behind Titanic), and the highest-grossing Star Wars film at the time (inflation notwithstanding). A 3D reissue, which earned an additional $102.7 million and brought the film's overall worldwide takings to over $1 billion, was released in February 2012. Attack of the Clones (2002) and Revenge of the Sith (2005) followed The Phantom Menace, rounding out the Star Wars prequel trilogy.

Plot 

The Trade Federation creates turmoil in the Galactic Republic by blockading the planet Naboo in protest of recent legislation taxing major galactic trade routes. The Republic's leader, Supreme Chancellor Finis Valorum, dispatches Jedi Master Qui-Gon Jinn and his apprentice, Obi-Wan Kenobi, to negotiate with Trade Federation Viceroy Nute Gunray. Darth Sidious, a Sith Lord and the Trade Federation's secret benefactor, orders the Viceroy to kill the Jedi and begin a planetary invasion with an army of battle droids, but the Jedi escape and flee to Naboo. During the invasion,  rescues a Gungan outcast, Jar Jar Binks. The Jedi fail to persuade the Gungan leader, Boss Nass, to help the planet's surface dwellers, but manage to obtain  guidance and underwater transport to Theed, the capital city of Naboo through the planet’s dangerous Core. Although they are attacked and chased by several monstrous beasts that dwell down there, they make it to Theed. After rescuing Queen Amidala, the group make their escape from Naboo aboard her Royal Starship, intending to reach the Republic capital planet of Coruscant.

Passing through the Federation blockade, the ship is damaged in the crossfire, and its hyperdrive malfunctions. The ship lands for repairs on the outlying desert planet of Tatooine, situated beyond the Republic's jurisdiction. Qui-Gon, Jar Jar, astromech droid R2-D2, and Queen Padmé Amidala (in disguise as one of her own handmaidens) visit the settlement of Mos Espa to purchase a new part for their hyperdrive. They encounter a junk dealer, Watto, and his nine-year-old slave, Anakin Skywalker, a gifted pilot and engineer who has built a protocol droid, C-3PO.

Qui-Gon senses a strong presence of the Force within Anakin, and is convinced that he is the prophesied "Chosen One," destined to restore balance to the Force. With Watto refusing to accept payment in Republic currency,  wagers both the required hyperdrive part and Anakin's freedom in a podrace. Anakin wins the race and joins the group to be trained as a Jedi, reluctantly leaving behind his mother, Shmi. En route to their starship,  encounters Darth Maul, Sidious' apprentice, who was sent to capture Amidala. After a brief lightsaber duel,  narrowly escapes aboard the starship with the others.

Qui-Gon and Obi-Wan escort Amidala to Coruscant so that she can plead her people's case to Chancellor Valorum and the Galactic Senate. Qui-Gon informs the Jedi Council that his attacker was a Sith and subsequently asks for permission to train Anakin as a Jedi, but the Council refuses his request, concerned that Anakin's age makes him vulnerable to the dark side of the Force. Undaunted,  vows to take up Anakin as his new apprentice. Meanwhile, Naboo's Senator Palpatine persuades Amidala to call for a vote of no confidence in Valorum to elect a more capable leader in order to resolve the crisis.

On Naboo, Padmé reveals herself as the actual queen before the Gungans to gain their trust, and persuades them to help against the Trade Federation.  is promoted to general and joins his tribe in a battle against the droid army, while Padmé leads the search for Gunray in Theed. Qui-Gon tells Anakin to hide inside a starfighter in the palace hangar, but he accidentally triggers its autopilot, and flies into space, joining the Naboo pilots in their battle against the Federation droid control ship. With R2's help, Anakin pilots the fighter into the ship and causes its destruction from within, deactivating the droid army. Maul mortally wounds Qui-Gon, but is then sliced in half by Obi-Wan and falls down a shaft. Qui-Gon asks Obi-Wan to train Anakin before dying in his arms.

Following the battle, Gunray is arrested by the Republic, and Palpatine is elected Chancellor. Master Yoda promotes  to the rank of Jedi Knight, and reluctantly accepts Anakin as  apprentice. A funeral is held for Qui-Gon, attended by the other Jedi, who contemplate that there is still one Sith remaining since there are always two of them. During a celebratory parade on Naboo, Padmé presents a gift of thanks to the Gungans to establish peace.

Cast 

 Liam Neeson as Qui-Gon Jinn, a Jedi Master who discovers Anakin Skywalker and under the belief that he is destined to bring balance to the force as the prophesied "Chosen One", insists that the boy be trained as a Jedi, despite the Jedi Council's refusal to do so. Lucas originally wanted to cast an American actor in the role, but cast Neeson (who is Northern Irish) because he considered that Neeson had great skills and presence. Lucas said Neeson was a "master actor, who the other actors will look up to, who has got the qualities of strength that the character demands."
 Ewan McGregor as Obi-Wan Kenobi, Qui-Gon's twenty-five-year-old Jedi Padawan, who holds his master in high regard but questions his motives at times, especially when it seems he is breaking the rules of the Jedi. McGregor was cast from a shortlist of fifty actors, all of whom had to be compared to pictures of young Alec Guinness, who portrayed the elderly Obi-Wan, to make a believable younger version. McGregor had a vocal coach to help his voice sound closer to Guinness's. He also studied several of Guinness's performances, from his early work and the original Star Wars films.
 Natalie Portman as Padmé Amidala, the fourteen-year-old Queen of Naboo, who hopes to protect her planet from the Trade Federation's blockade invasion. Throughout most of the film, she uses her birth name Padmé Naberrie and poses as one of the queen's handmaidens for protection. Over 200 actresses auditioned for the role. The production notes stated that "The role required a young woman who could be believable as the ruler of that planet, but at the same time be vulnerable and open". Portman was chosen especially for her performances in Léon: The Professional (1994) and Beautiful Girls (1996), which impressed Lucas.<ref name="ProductionNotes">{{cite web |url=https://www.starwars.com/episode-i/bts/production/f19990501/indexp4.html |archive-url=https://web.archive.org/web/20041023023458/http://www.starwars.com/episode-i/bts/production/f19990501/indexp4.html |archive-date=October 23, 2004 |date=May 1, 1999 |title=Star Wars Episode I Production Notes: The Actors and Characters – Part I |publisher=StarWars.com |access-date=April 5, 2009}}</ref> He stated, "I was looking for someone who was young, strong, along the lines of Leia [and] Natalie embodied all those traits and more". Portman was unfamiliar with Star Wars before being cast, but was enthusiastic about being cast as a character she expected to become a role model. Portman said, "It was wonderful playing a young queen with so much power. I think it will be good for young women to see a strong woman of action who is also smart and a leader."
 Jake Lloyd as Anakin "Ani" Skywalker, a nine-year-old slave boy and a skilled pilot who dreams of becoming a Jedi. Hundreds of actors were tested across the UK, Ireland, Canada, and the United States before the producers settled on Lloyd, who Lucas considered met his requirements of "a good actor, enthusiastic and very energetic". Producer Rick McCallum said that Lloyd was "smart, mischievous, and loves anything mechanicaljust like Anakin."
 Ian McDiarmid as Palpatine, a middle aged senator of Naboo and a secret Sith Lord who orchestrates the invasion of his home planet to get elected Supreme Chancellor. He is the Trade Federation's mysterious benefactor, and the titular "Phantom Menace". McDiarmid was surprised when Lucas approached him sixteen years after Return of the Jedi to reprise the role of Palpatine, having assumed that a younger actor would play the role in the prequel films.
 Ahmed Best as Jar Jar Binks, a clumsy Gungan exiled from his home and taken in by Qui-Gon and Obi-Wan. Best was hired after casting director Robin Gurland saw him on a Stomp performance in San Francisco. Best was originally intended to provide motion capture data, but his offer to voice the character was accepted. On the set, to provide references for the actors, Best was clothed in a suit made of foam and latex and a headpiece. Best's filmed performance was later replaced with the computer-generated character. Best frequently improvised movements to make Jar Jar look as clumsy and comedic as possible.
 Anthony Daniels as the voice of C-3PO, a protocol droid built by Anakin. He lacks a metal covering in this film; R2-D2 humorously refers to it as being "naked". Industrial Light & Magic's Michael Lynch, dressed in a color closely matching the backgroundin a manner similar to the Japanese puppet theater Bunraku manipulated a skeletal C-3PO figure attached to his front while Daniels read his lines off-camera. The puppeteer was erased from the film during post-production.
 Kenny Baker as R2-D2, an astromech droid from Naboo that saves Queen Amidala's ship when other astro droids fail. Before the film's production started, fans campaigned on the Internet to retain Baker as R2-D2; Lucas replied that the actor would reprise the role. Baker is used for scenes where R2-D2 bends forwards and backwards and wobbles from side-to-side. Robots and a digital model were used in other shots.
 Pernilla August as Shmi Skywalker, Anakin's mother, who is concerned for her son's future and allows him to leave with the Jedi. August, a veteran of Swedish cinema, was chosen after auditioning with Liam Neeson. She was afraid of being rejected because of her accent.
 Frank Oz as the voice of Yoda, the centuries-old Jedi Grandmaster and head of the Jedi Council who is apprehensive about allowing Anakin to be trained. Yoda was mostly portrayed as a puppet designed by Nick Dudman based on Stuart Freeborn's original design. Oz controlled the puppet's mouth, and other parts were controlled by puppeteers using remote controls. Lucas fitted Yoda's filming around Oz's schedule as he finished and promoted In & Out. A computer-generated Yoda is featured in two distant shots. Warwick Davis (who played the part of the Ewok Wicket W. Warrick in Return of the Jedi in 1983) portrays him in the scene where Obi-Wan becomes a Jedi Knight. Lucas said he originally wanted to use a full-time digital Yoda, but the attempts did not work well enough at the time. Beginning with the 2011 Blu-ray release of The Phantom Menace, which was also used for the 3D reissue, a CG Yoda replaced the puppet entirely.
 Oliver Ford Davies as Sio Bibble, the governor of Naboo.
 Hugh Quarshie as Captain Quarsh Panaka, Queen Amidala's chief of security at the Theed Palace.
 Samuel L. Jackson as Mace Windu, a Jedi Master and high-ranking member of the Jedi Council who opposes training Anakin.
 Ray Park as Darth Maul, Darth Sidious' Zabrak Sith apprentice, who wields a double-bladed lightsaber.
 Peter Serafinowicz as the voice of Darth Maul
 Terence Stamp as Finis Valorum, the Supreme Chancellor of the Galactic Republic who commissions Obi-Wan and Qui-Gon to negotiate with the Trade Federation viceroy. Lucas described the character as a "good man but he's beleaguereda bit like [Bill] Clinton".
 Keira Knightley as Sabé, one of Queen Amidala's handmaidens who serves as her decoy throughout the majority of the film.
 Silas Carson as:
 Nute Gunray, the viceroy of the Trade Federation who leads Naboo's invasion and tries to force Queen Amidala to sign a treaty to legitimize their occupation of the planet.
 Ki-Adi-Mundi, a wise and powerful Jedi Master who sits on the Council.
 Lott Dod, a Trade Federation Senator.
 An ill-fated pilot. This was the role for which Carson originally auditioned.
 Jerome St. John Blake as:
 Rune Haako, Gunray's chief lieutenant and Settlement Officer in the Trade Federation.
 James Taylor as the voice of Rune Haako.
 Oppo Rancisis, a Jedi Master and member of the Council.
 Orn Free Ta, a Twi-lek senator.
 Mas Amedda, a Chagrian politician and Vice Chair of the galactic senate.

Additionally, Brian Blessed voiced Boss Nass, the leader of the Gungan tribe who allies with the Naboo surface dwellers; Andy Secombe voiced Watto, a junk dealer on Tatooine who owns Anakin and his mother as slaves; and Lewis MacLeod voiced Sebulba, an aggressive, scheming podracer who is Anakin's main rival at the Boonta Eve podrace. Greg Proops and Scott Capurro voiced Fode and Beed, respectively, the two-headed announcer of the Boonta Eve Race. Alan Ruscoe appears as Jedi Master Plo Koon and Neimoidian Daultay Dofine, commander of the Trade Federation's droid control ships. Ralph Brown plays Ric Olie, commander of the Naboo Royal Space Fighter Corps and chief pilot aboard Queen Amidala's starship, while Matthew Wood appears as the Twi'lek Bib Fortuna alongside a CGI Jabba the Hutt, who is voiced by an uncredited actor. Dominic West plays the role of an unnamed Naboo guard, and Sofia Coppola appears as Saché, one of Amidala's handmaidens. Christian Simpson appears as Lieutenant Gavyn Sykes. Lindsay Duncan voices TC-14, a protocol droid on the Federation ship. Sally Hawkins made her screen debut as an uncredited villager.

 Production 

 Development 
While writing the original Star Wars film, Lucas decided the story was too vast to be covered in one film. He introduced a wider story arc that could be told in sequels if it became successful. He negotiated a contract that allowed him to make two sequels, and over time created an elaborate backstory to aid his writing process. While writing the second film The Empire Strikes Back, Lucas considered directions in which to take the story. In the original trilogy, Darth Vader was revealed to have been Anakin Skywalker, a once-powerful Jedi Knight, and a traitor to the Jedi Order. With this backstory in place, Lucas decided that the movies would work best as a trilogy. In the trilogy's final episode, Return of the Jedi, Vader is redeemed through an act of sacrifice for Luke.

Throughout the 1980s, Lucas said he had no desire to return to Star Wars and had canceled his sequel trilogy by the time of Return of the Jedi. However, because Lucas had developed most of the backstory, the idea of prequels continued to fascinate him. In the early 1990s, Star Wars saw a resurgence in popularity in the wake of Dark Horse's comic line and Timothy Zahn's trilogy of novels. Lucas saw that there was still a large audience for his idea of a prequel trilogy, and with the development of special effects generated with computer-generated imagery (CGI), Lucas considered returning to his saga and directing the film. In October 1993, it was announced in Variety and other sources that he would be making the prequels. Lucas began outlining the story; Anakin Skywalker rather than Obi-Wan Kenobi would be the protagonist, and the series would be a tragedy examining Darth Vader's origins. A relic of the original outline was that Anakin would, like his son, grow up on Tatooine. Lucas also began to change the prequels' timeline relative to the original series; instead of filling in the tangential history, they would form the beginning of a long story that started with Anakin's childhood and ended with his death. This was the final step toward turning the franchise into a saga.

Lucas began writing the Star Wars prequel trilogy on November 1, 1994. The screenplay of Star Wars was adapted from Lucas' 15-page outline that was written in 1976, which he designed to help him keep track of the characters' backstories and events that occurred before the original trilogy. Anakin was first written as a twelve-year-old, but Lucas reduced his age to nine because he felt that the lower age would better fit the plot point of Anakin being affected by his mother's separation from him. Eventually, Anakin's younger age led Lucas to rewrite his participation in the movie's major scenes. The film's working title was The Beginning, with the title not being changed to The Phantom Menace until shortly before the film's completion. Lucas later revealed that the Phantom Menace title was a reference to Palpatine hiding his true identity as an evil Sith Lord behind the facade of a well-intentioned public servant.

The larger budget and possibilities opened up by the use of digital effects made Lucas "think about a much grander, more epic scale"which is what I wanted Star Wars to be". The story ended with five simultaneous, ongoing plots, one leading to another. The central plot is Palpatine's intent to become Chancellor, which leads to the Trade Federation's attack on Naboo, the Jedi being sent there, Anakin being met along the way, and the rise of the Sith Lords. As with the original trilogy, Lucas intended The Phantom Menace to illustrate several themes throughout the narrative. Duality is a frequent theme; Amidala is a queen who passes as a handmaiden, Palpatine plays on both sides of the war, among others. "Balance" is frequently suggested; Anakin is supposedly "the one" chosen to bring balance to the ForceLucas said, "Anakin needed to have a mother, Obi-Wan needed a Master, Darth Sidious needed an apprentice" as without interaction and dialogue, "you wouldn't have drama".

In November 2015, Ron Howard confirmed that he, Robert Zemeckis, and Steven Spielberg were approached by Lucas to direct The Phantom Menace. All three approached directors told Lucas that he should direct the film, as they each found the project "too daunting."

 Pre-production and design 
Before Lucas had started writing, his producing partner Rick McCallum was preparing for the film. McCallum stated that his experience with The Young Indiana Jones Chronicles led to many of his decisions on The Phantom Menace, such as long-term deals with actors and soundstages, the employment of recent graduates with no film experience, and the creation of sets and landscapes with digital technology. In April 1994, McCallum started searching for artists in art, architecture and design schools, and in mid-year he began location scouting with production designer Gavin Bocquet. Industrial Light & Magic (ILM) art director Doug Chiang impressed McCallum the most and was hired as the design director. Art development on the film began in January 1995.

Within three to four months of Lucas beginning the writing process, Chiang and his design team started a two-year process of reviewing thousands of designs for the film. Chiang stated that Lucas intended Episode I to be stylistically different from the other Star Wars films; it would be "richer and more like a period piece, since it was the history leading up to A New Hope." The story takes place on three planets, some with varied environments such as the human and Gungan cities of Naboo and three buildings in Coruscant. With the exception of the Gungan city, which had an art nouveau-inspired visual, these locations would be given distinctive looks with some basis in the real world. The concept drawings of Ralph McQuarrie for the original trilogy served as the basis for Mos Espawhich was also inspired by old Tunisian hotels and buildings and had touches such as a marketplace to differentiate it from A New Hopes Mos Eisleyand Coruscant, in particular a metropolis design that became the basis for the Senate. Bocquet would later develop the work of Chiang's team and design the interiors, translating the concepts into construction blueprints with environments and architectural styles that had some basis in reality "to give the audience something to key into." Some elements were directly inspired by the original trilogy; Lucas described the battle droids as predecessors to the stormtroopers. Chiang uses that orientation to base the droids on the Imperial soldiers, only in the same style of stylized and elongated features seen in tribal African art.

Terryl Whitlatch, who had a background on zoology and anatomy, was in charge of creature design. Many of the aliens are hybrids, combining features of real animals. At times, entire food chains were developed, even though only a small percentage of them would appear in the film. Whitlatch also designed detailed skeletons for the major characters and facial muscles on Jar Jar Binks as a reference for ILM's animators. Each creature would reflect its environment; those on Naboo were more beautiful because the planet is "lush and more animal-friendly", Tatooine has rough-looking creatures "with weather-beaten leathery skin to protect them from the harsh desert elements", and Coruscant has bipedal, human-looking aliens.

The film made extensive use of the new technique of digital pre-visualization, using computers to essentially create 3-D animated storyboards. This was done for dozens of scenes in the film but was first and primarily used in the pod race sequence. Animatic supervisor David Dozoretz, also an ILM alum, worked on this sequence for nearly three years, and at one point had a 25 minute version of the race, although the film only included a 9-minute version.

Stunt coordinator Nick Gillard was recruited to create a new Jedi fighting style for the prequel trilogy. Gillard likened the lightsaber battles to a chess game "with every move being a check". Because of their short-range weapons, Gillard thought that the Jedi would have had to develop a fighting style that merged every swordfighting style, such as kendo and other kenjutsu styles, with other swinging techniques, such as tennis swings and tree-chopping. While training Liam Neeson and Ewan McGregor, Gillard wrote a sequence that lasted around 60 seconds and intended to be around five or six sequences per fight. Lucas later referred to the Jedi as "negotiators" rather than high-casualty soldiers. The preference of hand-to-hand combat was intended to give a spiritual and intellectual role to the Jedi. Because Gillard thought that the stunt jumps with the actors and stuntmen dangling from wires did not look realistic, air rams were used to propel them into the air instead.

Lucas decided to make elaborate costumes, because the film's society was more sophisticated than the one depicted in the original trilogy. Designer Trisha Biggar and her team created over 1,000 costumes that were inspired by various cultures. Biggar worked closely with concept designer Iain McCaig to create a color palette for the inhabitants of each world: Tatooine followed A New Hope with sun-bleached sand colors, Coruscant had grays, browns, and blacks, and Naboo had green and gold for humans while Gungans wore "a leathery look, like their skin". The Jedi costumes followed the tradition from the original film; Obi-Wan's costume was inspired by the costume that was worn by Guinness. Lucas said he and Biggar would look at the conceptual art to "translat[e] all of these designs into cloth and fabric and materials that would actually work and not look silly". Biggar also consulted Gillard to ensure that the costumes would accommodate action scenes, and consulted the creature department to find which fabrics "wouldn't wear too heavily" on the alien skins. A huge wardrobe department was set up at Leavesden Film Studios to create over 250 costumes for the main actors and 5,000 for the background ones.

Nute Gunray's Thai accent was chosen after Lucas and McCallum listened to various languages to decide how the Neimoidians would speak. The character design of Watto was an amalgam of rejected ideas; his expressions were based on video footage of Secombe's voice acting, photographs of animation supervisor Rob Coleman imitating the character, and modeler Steve Alpin saying Watto's lines to a mirror. Lucas described Sebulba's design as "a spider crossed with an orangutan crossed with a sloth", with a camel-like face, and clothing inspired by medieval armor.

 Casting 
After Samuel L. Jackson expressed interest in appearing in a Star Wars film, he was approached by casting director Robin Gurland to play Mace Windu. Jackson was originally slated to play Grando Calrissian, the father of The Empire Strikes Back character Lando Calrissian, but that character was dropped when Jackson signed on to play Windu instead. Rapper Tupac Shakur was also considered for the role of Mace Windu. Ray Park, a martial arts champion with experience in gymnastics and sword fighting, was originally a member of the stunt crew. Stunt coordinator Nick Gillard filmed Park to demonstrate his conception of the lightsaber battles. Lucas and McCallum were so impressed with the test tape that they gave Park the role of Maul. His voice was considered "too squeaky" and was dubbed over in post-production by Peter Serafinowicz. Keira Knightley's parents tried to convince her not to audition, but the teenage actress still sought a role since she was a Star Wars fan. The casting was influenced by Knightley's remarkable similarity to Natalie Portman, with the actress admitting their mothers could not tell each other apart. Knightley was reported to have "cried every single day" due to finding the wardrobe uncomfortable.

Over 3,000 actors auditioned for the role of Anakin Skywalker including Haley Joel Osment, Cameron Finley, Justin Berfield and Michael Angarano before Jake Lloyd was selected. Vinette Robinson auditioned for the role of Padmé Amidala. Benicio del Toro was originally cast as Darth Maul, but later left the project when the character’s lines were cut. Michael Jackson expressed interest in playing Jar Jar Binks, but he wanted to do it in prosthetic make ups while George Lucas wanted to do it in CGI. Joseph Fiennes auditioned for the role of Obi-Wan Kenobi and nearly landed the part until George Lucas's young daughter rejected him upon meeting him during the second level of auditioning.

Silas Carson was cast as Nute Gunray because another actor was uncomfortable with the costumes used by the Trade Federation characters, which were hot, exerted a lot of pressure on the bearer, and took about 15 minutes to apply. Hugh Quarshie considered the part of Panaka as "a good career move" and a production that would be fun to make. Brian Blessed originally auditioned for the role of Sio Bibble, the Governor of Naboo, for which he was considered "too loud". Casting director Robin Gurland approached him to play Nass because it was a "bigger than life" character with "a kind of bravado". Blessed described Nass as a "reluctant hero". Sofia Coppola, daughter of Lucas' long-time friend and creative partner Francis Ford Coppola, considers Lucas as "like an uncle to me". As she prepared the script for her directorial debut The Virgin Suicides, Coppola heard Lucas would be making a new Star Wars film and asked him if she could accompany him during filming. Lucas offered Coppola a role in the royal entourage, which she accepted because it "seemed like a good vantage point to watch without getting in the way".

 Filming 

Filming began on June 26, 1997, and ended on September 30 of that year, primarily taking place at Leavesden Film Studios in England. Leavesden was leased for a two and a half year period so the production company could leave the sets intact and return after principal photography had been completed. The forest scenes on Naboo were filmed at Cassiobury Park in Watford, Hertfordshire. Pick-ups were shot between August 1998 and February 1999 after Lucas screened a rough cut of the film for friends and colleagues in May 1998. Most of the action and stunts were filmed by Roger Christian's second unit, which worked alongside the main unit instead of afterwards because of the high number of shots to be completed daily.

The Tunisian desert was again used for the Tatooine scenes; Mos Espa was built outside the city of Tozeur. On the night following the third day of shooting in Tozeur, an unexpected sandstorm destroyed many of the sets and props. The production was quickly rescheduled to allow for repairs and was able to leave Tunisia on the date originally planned. The Italian Caserta Palace was used as the interior of the Theed City Naboo Palace; it was used as a location for four days after it had been closed to visitors. Scenes with explosions were filmed on replica sets in Leavesden.

A binder with the film's storyboards served as a reference for live-action filming, shots that would be filmed in front of a chroma key blue screen, and shots that would be composed using CGI. The sets were often built with the parts that would be required on screen; often they were built only up to the heights of the actors. Chroma key was extensively used for digital set extensions, backgrounds, or scenes that required cinematographer David Tattersall to seek powerful lamps to light the sets and visual effects supervisor John Knoll to develop software that would remove the blue reflection from shiny floors. Knoll, who remained on set through most of the production, worked closely with Tattersall to ensure that the shots were suitable to add effects later. The cameras were fitted with data capture models to provide technical data for the CGI artists.The Phantom Menace was the final Star Wars film to be shot on 35mm film until The Force Awakens (2015). Some scenes, mostly of elements filmed by the special effects team, were shot on high definition digital video tapes to test the performance of digital recordings, which Lucas and McCallum considered the next logical step because of the amount of digitizingan expensive process compared to recording directly on digital mediafor the compositing of computer-generated effects. All future films would be shot using Sony CineAlta high-definition video cameras. Greg Proops and Scott Capurro were filmed wearing makeup and blue bodysuits so their heads could be joined in a computer-generated body. The visual effects crew did not like the original results and crafted Fode and Beed as an entirely computer generated alien.

Because of the amount of visual effects produced, editing took two years; Paul Martin Smith started the process in England and focused on dialogue-heavy scenes. Ben Burttwho was also the film's sound editorwas responsible for action sequences under Lucas' supervision. Non-linear editing systems played a large part in translating Lucas' vision; he constantly tweaked, revised, and reworked shots and scenes. The final sound mix was added in March 1999, and the following month, the film was completed after the delivery of the remaining visual effects shots.

 Effects 

The film saw a breakthrough in computer generated effects. About 1,950 of the shots in The Phantom Menace have visual effects. The scene in which toxic gas is released on the Jedi is the only sequence with no digital alteration. The work was so extensive that three visual effects supervisors divided the workload among themselvesJohn Knoll supervised the on-set production and the podrace and space battle sequences, Dennis Muren supervised the underwater sequence and the ground battle, and Scott Squires, alongside teams assigned for miniature effects and character animation, worked on the lightsaber effects.

Until the film's production, many special effects in the film industry were achieved using miniature models, matte paintings, and on-set visual effectsalthough other films had made extensive use of CGI. Knoll previewed 3,500 storyboards for the film; Lucas accompanied him to explain factors of the shots that would be practical and those that would be created through visual effects. Knoll later said that on hearing the explanations of the storyboards, he did not know how to accomplish what he had seen. The result was a mixture of original techniques and the newest digital techniques to make it difficult for the viewer to guess which technique was being used. Knoll and his visual effects team wrote new computer software, including cloth simulators to allow a realistic depiction of the digital characters' clothing, to create certain shots. Another goal was to create computer-generated characters that could act seamlessly with live-action actors. While filming scenes with CGI characters, Lucas would block the characters using their corresponding voice actors on-set. The voice actors were then removed and the live-action actors would perform the same scene alone. A CGI character would later be added into the shot to complete the conversation. Lucas also used CGI to correct the physical presence of actors in certain scenes. Practical models were used when their visuals helped with miniature sceneries for backgrounds, set extensions, and model vehicles that would be scanned to create the digital models or filmed to represent spaceships and podraces.

Lucas, who had previously confronted problems with the props used to depict R2-D2, allowed ILM and the production's British special effects department to create their own versions of the robot. Nine R2-D2 models were created; one was for actor Kenny Baker to be dropped into, seven were built by ILM and featured two wheelchair motors capable of moving , enabling it to run and be mostly used in stage sets, and the British studio produced a pneumatic R2-D2 that could shift from two to three legs and was mostly used in Tunisia because its motor drive system allowed it to drive over sand.

Lucas originally planned to create many of the aliens with computer graphics, but those that would be more cost-effectively realized with masks and animatronics were created by Nick Dudman's creature effects team. These included the Neimoidians, background characters in Mos Espa, the Jedi Council, and the Galactic Senate. Dudman's team was told where the creatures would be required six months before principal photography begun, and they rushed the production. The Neimodian suits, which were originally intended as digital characters, were delivered one day before they would be required on set. Dudman traveled to Skywalker Ranch to see the original creatures that could be reused, and read the script for a breakdown of scenes with practical creatures, leaving only the more outlandish designs to be created using CGI.

To research for the podrace vehicles, the visual effects crew visited a jet aircraft junkyard outside Phoenix, Arizona and scavenged four Boeing 747 engines. Life-sized replicas of the engines were built and sent to Tunisia to provide reference in the film. Except for Jake Lloyd inside a hydraulically controlled cockpit and a few practical podracer models, the entire podracing scenewhich the effects crew designed to be as "out of this world" as possibleis computer-generated.

 Themes 

Like previous Star Wars films, The Phantom Menace makes several references to historical events and films that George Lucas watched in his youth. The Star Wars films typically mix several concepts from different mythologies together, drawing heavily from the hero's journey, an archetypical template developed by comparative mythologist Joseph Campbell. The film also notably borrows from Ben-Hur (1959), including the podrace sequence, which mirrors the chariot race scene; additionally, the end celebration scene closely resembles a Roman parade in Ben-Hur.

There are many references to Christianity in the film, such as the appearance of Darth Maul, whose design draws heavily from traditional depictions of the devil, complete with red skin and horns. The Star Wars film cycle features a similar Christian narrative involving Anakin Skywalker; he is the "Chosen One"—the individual prophesied to bring balance to the Force—who was conceived of a virgin birth. However, unlike Jesus, Anakin will eventually fall from grace and seemingly fail to fulfill his destiny (until the prophecy comes true in Return of the Jedi).

Japanese films such as Akira Kurosawa's The Hidden Fortress (1958) influenced the original Star Wars film; scholars say that The Phantom Menace was likewise influenced by Korean and Japanese culture. Film historians Geoff King and Tanya Krzywinska write, "The costume and make-up designs ... favour a mixture of the gothic and the oriental over anything very futuristic. The gothic is most strongly apparent in Darth Maul's demonic horns and the red and black make-up mask that borrows from the facial designs found in depictions of Japanese demons". King and Krzywinska say that "Qui-Gon's pony tail and Obi-Wan's position of apprentice further encourage a reading in terms of the Samurai tradition". They also say "Amidala, in keeping with her status and character, has a number of highly formal outfits ... to go with hair sculpted into a curve that frames make-up of a Japanese cast".

The Jedi practice Zen-like meditation and martial arts, as did the ancient Japanese Samurai warriors. The name "Qui-Gon" adapts the term qigong, which refers to a Chinese discipline involving meditation and cultivation of the flow of the vital energy called "Chi" or "Qi" for healing, health, and combat. The words Ch'i (Chinese), gi (Korean), ki (Japanese), and the Indian term "Prana" all refer to the energy that is thought to flow through all living things, from the source of all chi (or power), which is "The Way" or "The Tao" in Chinese philosophy. In Taoist philosophy, from The Way, yin and yang—the opposing but complementary aspects of reality or nature—are born. Unlike Chinese philosophy, in which yin and yang are not moral qualities, the ancient Persian philosophy of Zurvanism taught that the dualism of dark and light forces are locked in an eternal battle while being two sides (or evolutes) of the same "Force", the force of time itself (Zurvan)—the prime mover. These elements derive primarily from Eastern and Iranian religions and myths.

As with other Star Wars films, themes about family and hope are featured prominently. In the episode "Legacy" of Disney Gallery: The Mandalorian, Dave Filoni explains that the use of "Duel of the Fates" during the lightsaber duel between Darth Maul against Qui-Gon Jinn and Obi-Wan Kenobi represents the fight for the fate of Anakin Skywalker. According to Filoni, Qui-Gon Jinn acts like a father figure towards Anakin because he feels he needs one after taking him from his mother, having realized that the Jedi shouldn't be opposed to love and care. In the end, Qui-Gon dies, and thus Anakin loses his father figure; Obi-Wan Kenobi ultimately becomes his master to honor Jinn's dying wish despite his initial contempt for him, and while he comes to eventually see him like a brother as shown in Attack of the Clones and Revenge of the Sith, he doesn't act like a father, which coupled with the Jedi's indifference, seals Anakin's fate.

 Music 

As with previous Star Wars films, Star Wars Episode I: The Phantom Menaces score was composed and conducted by John Williams. He started composing the score in October 1998 and began recording the music with the London Voices and London Symphony Orchestra at Abbey Road Studios on February 10, 1999. Williams decided to use electronic instruments such as synthesizers to enhance the sound and choral pieces to "capture the magical, mystical force that a regular orchestra might not have been able to provide", and create an atmosphere that was "more mysterious and mystical and less military" than those of the original trilogy. One of the most notable tracks is "Duel of the Fates", which uses the chorus to give a religious, temple-like feel to the epic lightsaber duel. The track was made into a music video. While composing Anakin's theme, Williams tried to reflect the innocence of his childhood and to foreshadow his transformation into Darth Vader by using slight suggestions of "The Imperial March" in the melody.

The film's soundtrack was released by Sony Classical Records on May 4, 1999. This album featured the score, which Williams restructured as a listening experience; it is not presented in film order and omits many notable cues from the film because of the space restriction of the compact disc. A two-disc "Ultimate Edition" was released on November 14, 2000. The set features the entire score as it is heard in the film, including all of the edits and loops that were made for the sound mix.

 Marketing 
 Promotion 
Lucasfilm spent  on the film's advertising campaign and made promotional licensing deals with Hasbro, Lego, Tricon Global Restaurants, and PepsiCo. Lucasfilm also helped the Star Wars fan club to organize an event called Star Wars Celebration, which was held in Denver, Colorado, between April 30 and May 2, 1999.

The first teaser trailer was released on selected screens accompanying Meet Joe Black on November 13, 1998, and media reported that people were paying full admission at theaters to see the trailer. Other films that played this trailer included The Waterboy, The Siege and A Bug's Life. To keep fans from leaving before the movie was over, some theaters played the teaser an additional time after the film finished. The second trailer debuted on March 12, 1999, with the film Wing Commander. Again, many fans paid full theater admission to watch the new trailer. A bootlegged version of the preview was leaked to the Internet the same day. The next morning, the trailer was released on the film's official website and shortly afterwards the servers became overloaded. This trailer had over 1 million downloads within its first 24 hours of release, setting a record for the most downloaded trailer until it was surpassed by The Lord of the Rings: The Fellowship of the Ring in April 2000. The theatrical trailer caused even more media attention because it was premiered in theaters and screened at the ShoWest Convention in Las Vegas, and was aired on Entertainment Tonight and Access Hollywood.

The teaser poster, featuring Anakin with his shadow forming Darth Vader's silhouette, was released on November 10, 1998. After Lucas opted for a drawn theatrical poster, Drew Struzan, the artist responsible for the Special Edition posters, was commissioned to illustrate, and the poster was unveiled on March 11, 1999. Lucasfilm dictated that, contractually, Struzan's illustration was the only art the foreign distributors could use, and other than the text, it could not be modified in any way. The film also reused the Godzilla slogan on teaser posters.

 Adaptations 
A novelization was written by Terry Brooks, who met with Lucas before writing the book and received his approval and guidance. It includes some scenes that are not in the film and foreshadows pending developments in the following two installments of the series. Additionally, a Scholastic junior novelization was written by Patricia C. Wrede. A four-issue comic book adaptation was written by Henry Gilroy and published by Dark Horse Comics. The film was again adapted as part of the all-ages Star Wars: The Prequel Trilogy – A Graphic Novel, released by Disney-Lucasfilm Press in 2017.

A LucasArts video game adaptation was released for the PlayStation and PC. The podracing tie-in Star Wars Episode I: Racer was released for Nintendo 64, PC, and other platforms. A pinball machine was created by WMS Industries.

 Release 
 Theatrical 
The release of the first new Star Wars film in 16 years was accompanied by a considerable amount of attention. According to The Wall Street Journal, so many workers announced plans to view the premiere that many companies closed on the opening day. Queue areas formed outside cinema theaters over a month before ticket sales began. More theater lines appeared when it was announced that cinemas were not allowed to sell tickets in advance until two weeks into the release. This was because of a fear that family theater-goers would be either unable to receive tickets or would be forced to pay higher prices for them. Instead, tickets were to be sold on a first-come-first-served basis. However, after meetings with the National Association of Theatre Owners, Lucasfilm agreed to allow advance ticket sales on May 12, 1999, provided there was a limit of 12 tickets per customer. As a result, some advance tickets were sold by scalpers at prices as high as  apiece, which a distribution chief called "horrible" and said was exactly what they wanted to avoid. Daily Variety reported that theater owners received strict instructions from Lucasfilm that the film could only play in the cinema's largest auditorium for the first 8–12 weeks, no honor passes were allowed for the first eight weeks, and they were obliged to send their payments to distributor 20th Century Fox within seven days.

Despite worries about the film being finished on time, two weeks before its theatrical release, Lucasfilm moved the release date from May 21 to 19, 1999. At the ShoWest Convention, Lucas said the change was intended to give the fans a "head start" by allowing them to view it during the week and allowing families to view it during weekends. Other charity premieres included the Dallas premiere for the Children's Medical Center, the Aubrey Fund for Pediatric Cancer Research at the Sloan-Kettering Hospital in New York, the Big Brother/Sister Association of the Philadelphia premiere, and the Children's National Medical Center in Washington, D.C. A statement said that tickets were sold at  apiece and that certain sections of the theaters were set aside for disadvantaged children.

The film had its UK premiere at the Royal Film Performance, an event held in aid of the Film & TV Charity, on the 14th July, 1999 at the ODEON Leicester Square. This event was attended by the Prince of Wales and helped to raise £225,000 for the charity.

The film opened at 12:01 am on Wednesday, May 19, 1999 in 2,010 theaters in the United States and Canada. An additional 960 theaters screened the film later in the day. About 120 theaters showed the film continuously on opening day, including the Ziegfeld Theatre in New York City and the Chinese Theatre in Los Angeles. Foreshadowing his future conversion to digital cinematography, Lucas said the film would be released on four digital projectors (two in New York and two in Los Angeles) on June 18, 1999. Few film studios released films during the same week: DreamWorks and Universal Studios released The Love Letter on May 21 and Notting Hill on May 28, respectively. The Love Letter was a commercial failure but Notting Hill fared better and followed The Phantom Menace closely in second place. Employment consultant firm Challenger, Gray & Christmas estimated that 2.2 million full-time employees missed work to attend the film, resulting in a  loss of productivity.

 Home media 

The film was released on VHS on April 4, 2000. There were two versions of the film, which were a standard pan and scan version and a widescreen Collector's Edition version. In its first two days of availability, the regular version sold 4.5 million copies and the limited edition sold 500,000. A year later on June 19, 2001, it was announced that The Phantom Menace would become the first Star Wars film to be officially released on DVD, in a slightly extended cut from the theatrical releases. This THX certified two-disc DVD release debuted on October 16 of the same year. The first disc contains the film and the second disc contains special features. On the first disc, there are three randomized selected menus themed to the planets Naboo, Tatooine and Coruscant. There is an Easter egg located in the options menu. When the THX Optimizer is highlighted, the viewer can press 1-1-3-8. By doing this, some bloopers and DVD credits will be shown. The special features include seven deleted scenes completed specifically for the DVD, a commentary track featuring Lucas and producer Rick McCallum, and several documentariesincluding a full-length documentary entitled The Beginning: Making Episode I. There are also DVD-ROM features, including trailers for Attack of the Clones. The Phantom Menace became the fastest-selling DVD ever in the United States; 2.2 million copies were sold in its first week after release. This surpassed the previous record, The Mummy Returns with 2 million copies. Less than a month later, the record for the fastest-selling DVD was taken by Shrek when it sold 2.5 million copies in its first three days.

The DVD version was re-released in a prequel trilogy box set on November 4, 2008. A LaserDisc version of The Phantom Menace was released in Japan on April 7, 2000, one year and six months before it was available on DVD in the U.S. The Star Wars films were released by 20th Century Fox Home Entertainment on Blu-ray Disc on September 16, 2011; The Phantom Menace was restored to improve the picture quality and remove the magnification present on the previous DVD release, restoring approximately 8 percent of the picture to the frame. In the Blu-ray release of The Phantom Menace, the Yoda puppet was replaced with a CGI model, making it consistent with the other films of the prequel trilogy.

On April 7, 2015, Walt Disney Studios, 20th Century Fox, and Lucasfilm jointly announced the digital releases of the six released Star Wars films. The Phantom Menace was released through the iTunes Store, Amazon Video, Vudu, Google Play, and Disney Movies Anywhere on April 10, 2015.

Walt Disney Studios Home Entertainment reissued The Phantom Menace on Blu-ray, DVD, and digital download on September 22, 2019. Additionally, all six films were available for 4K HDR and Dolby Atmos streaming on Disney+ upon the service's launch on November 12, 2019. This version of the film was released by Disney on 4K Ultra HD Blu-ray box set on March 31, 2020.

 3D re-release 
On September 28, 2010, it was announced that all six films in the series would be stereo-converted to 3D. These would be re-released in episode order, beginning with The Phantom Menace, which was released to cinemas on February 10, 2012. Prime Focus Limited did the conversion under the supervision of ILM. However, the 3D re-releases of Episodes II–VI were postponed or canceled after Lucasfilm was bought by The Walt Disney Company, who decided to focus on the development of Star Wars: The Force Awakens.

Lucas stated the 3D re-release was "just a conversion" of the film's 2011 Blu-ray release and no additional changes were made. Only a change to Anakin's magnetic wand during the podrace sceneits tip was sharpened to more accurately fit the original 2D photography to the new 3D imagewas confirmed.

General Mills and Brisk were promotional partners in North America for the 3D re-release but promotion was limited. The film was extensively promoted in Japan; promotional products were sold by 7-Eleven, Domino's Pizza, Pepsi and Gari-Gari Kun. Kellogg's promoted the film internationally, and French restaurant Quick launched three Star Wars-themed burgers. Lucasfilm also partnered with Variety, the Children's Charity to raise funds for children through the sale of a special edition badge.

 Reception 
 Critical response 
Following an advance screening on Saturday, May 8, 1999, several newspapers broke an agreement with Fox and published reviews of the film on Sunday, May 9. In a front page review, the Los Angeles Daily News gave it 3½ stars calling it "pretty good" overall and "outstanding in many parts". The New York Daily News was less positive, giving it 2½ stars. Variety also made its review by Todd McCarthy available on the Sunday with McCarthy calling it "the most widely anticipated and heavily hyped film of modern times" but said that the film "can scarcely help being a letdown on some levels, but it’s too bad that it disappoints on so many" and that "it is neither captivating nor transporting, for it lacks any emotional pull, as well as the sense of wonder and awe that marks the best works of sci-fi/fantasy".

The site's critical consensus reads, "Burdened by exposition and populated with stock characters, The Phantom Menace gets the Star Wars prequels off to a bumpy – albeit visually dazzling – start." As of July 2022, the film is the lowest-rated live-action film of the Star Wars series dropping below The Rise of Skywalker. On Metacritic, the film has a weighted average score of 51 out of 100, based on 36 critics, indicating "mixed or average reviews". Audiences polled by CinemaScore gave the film an average grade of "A−" on an A+ to F scale.

Many aspects of the script and characters were criticized, especially that of Jar Jar Binks, who was regarded by many members of the older fan community as toyetica merchandising opportunity rather than a serious character. Kenneth Turan of the Los Angeles Times described Binks as "a major miscue, a comic-relief character who's frankly not funny". Drew Grant of Salon wrote, "Perhaps the absolute creative freedom director George Lucas enjoyed while dreaming up the flick's 'comic' reliefwith no studio execs and not many an independently minded actor involvedis a path to the dark side."

Conversely, Roger Ebert of the Chicago Sun-Times gave it three-and-a-half stars out of four and called it "an astonishing achievement in imaginative filmmaking" and said, "Lucas tells a good story." Ebert also wrote that, "If some of the characters are less than compelling, perhaps that's inevitable" because it is the opening film in the new trilogy. He concluded his review by saying that rather than Star Trek films, filmmakers could "[g]ive me transparent underwater cities and vast hollow senatorial spheres any day". Owen Gleiberman of Entertainment Weekly gave the film a "B" grade and complimented Liam Neeson's performance and the action scenes. In an Entertainment Weekly review for the DVD release, Marc Bernardin gave the film a "C−", calling it "haplessly plotted, horribly written, and juvenile". ReelViews' James Berardinelli wrote, "Looking at the big picture, in spite of all its flaws, The Phantom Menace is still among the best 'bang for a buck' fun that can be had in a movie theater," and said the film was a "distinct improvement" over Return of the Jedi.

Andrew Johnston of Time Out New York wrote, "Let's face it: no film could ever match the expectations some have for Episode IThe Phantom Menace. Which isn't to say it's a disappointment: on the contrary, it's awesomely entertaining, provided you accept it on its own terms ... Like the original film, it's a Boy's Own adventure yarn with a corny but irresistible spiritual subtext. The effects and production design are stunning, but they always serve the story, not the other way around." Susan Wloszczyna of USA Today said that the film did "plenty right" and praised the characters Darth Maul and Watto. David Cornelius of efilmcritic.com said that the film's better moments "don't merely balance out the weaker onesthey topple them". Colin Kennedy of Empire magazine said that despite problems with pacing and writing, "there is still much pleasure to be had watching our full-blown Jedi guides in action". He praised the visuals and Liam Neeson's performance, and said that the duel between Darth Maul and the Jedi was "the saga's very best lightsaber battle".Empire magazine ranked The Phantom Menace on its list of "500 Greatest Movies of All Time", while Entertainment Weekly and Comcast included the film on their lists of the worst movie sequels. James Berardinelli wrote, "The Phantom Menace was probably the most overhyped motion picture of the last decade (if not longer), and its reputation suffered as a result of its inability to satisfy unreasonable expectations." William Arnold of the Seattle Post-Intelligencer agreed that the film's massive hype caused many of the negative reactions, saying, "it built expectations that can't possibly be matched and scuttled [the] element of storytelling surprise". He also said that the film was "well made and entertaining" and was much better than similar box office fare released around that year, such as The Mummy and The Matrix. Ewan McGregor said in 2002 that he was "slightly disappointed" that the film was "kind of flat" and believed the next film in the franchise would have "much more humor and...color."

The introduction of midi-chlorians—microscopic organisms that mediate use of the Force—has been regarded as controversial. Some viewed it as a concept that negates the Force's spiritual quality. Film historian Daniel Dinello says, "Anathema to Star Wars fanatics who thought they reduced the Force to a kind of viral infection, midi-chlorians provide a biological interface, the link between physical bodies and spiritual energy." Religion expert John D. Caputo writes, "In the 'Gospel according to Lucas', a world is conjured up in which the intractable oppositions that have tormented religious thinkers for centuries are reconciled ... The gifts that the Jedi masters enjoy have a perfectly plausible scientific basis, even if its ways are mysterious: their bodily cells have a heavier than usual concentration of 'midi-chlorians'."

There has been some controversy over whether several alien characters reflect racial stereotypes. For example, the oafish, slow-witted Jar Jar Binks has long droopy ears reminiscent of dreadlocks and spoke with what many perceived as a Caribbean patois reminiscent of Jamaican Creole. Drew Grant describes the character as "[s]ervile and cowardly ... a black minstrel-ish stereotype on par with Stepin Fetchit." Georgetown University professor of African-American studies Michael Eric Dyson says that the entire Gungan species seems suggestive of a primitive African tribe, with Boss Nass portrayed as "a fat, bumbling ... caricature of a stereotypical African tribal chieftain." The greedy and corrupt Neimoidians of the Trade Federation have been noted as resembling East Asian stereotypes, and the unprincipled trader Watto has been interpreted as a Jewish stereotype reminiscent of Charles Dickens' character Fagin. Lucas has denied all of these implications, instead criticizing the American media for using opinions from the Internet as a reliable source for news stories. Lucas added that it reflects more the racism of the commenters than it does the movie; however, animator Rob Coleman said ahead of the film's release that Watto's mannerisms were inspired by footage of Alec Guinness as Fagin in Oliver Twist.

 Box office 
Even though it received mixed reviews, The Phantom Menace was a financial success, breaking many box office records in its debut, and beating out The Mummy by taking number 1. The film broke The Lost World: Jurassic Parks records for the largest single-day gross for taking more than $28 million in the opening day and fastest to gross $100 million in five days. Additionally, it grossed $64.8 million in its opening weekend, the second-ever highest at the time, behind The Lost World: Jurassic Park. It also became the quickest film to reach the $200 million and $300 million marks, surpassing Independence Day (1996) and Titanic (1997) respectively.  The Phantom Menace held both records before Spider-Man took them in 2002. It would go on to earn $105.7 million, making it the highest five-day Wednesday opening weekend of all time. The film had the biggest opening weekend for any 20th Century Fox film for two years until 2001 when it was taken by Planet of the Apes. Its opening day record was handed to Harry Potter and the Sorcerer's Stone that same year. Two years later in 2003, The Lord of the Rings: The Return of the King surpassed The Phantom Menace for having the largest five-day Wednesday opening weekend. During its second weekend, The Phantom Menace made $51.3 million, making it the highest-grossing second weekend at the time, surpassing Jurassic Park. The film would hold this record until it was surpassed a year later by How the Grinch Stole Christmas. In total, the film stayed at the top of the box office for three weeks until it was overtaken by Austin Powers: The Spy Who Shagged Me during its fourth weekend. The Phantom Menace was 1999's most successful film, staying in the Top 10 until August 5 (11 weeks total), earning $431.1 million in the United States and Canada. Box Office Mojo estimates that the film sold over 84.8 million tickets in the US in its initial theatrical run.

The film set an opening record in Japan, grossing $12.2 million in its first two days from 403 screens. In the UK, the film also set an opening record with £9.5 million in its opening weekend (including previews), surpassing Men in Black. It would go on to hold this record until it was taken by Toy Story 2 a few months later. The Phantom Menace also grossed a record $11 million in its opening weekend in Germany. Outside the United States and Canada, the film grossed over $10 million in Australia ($25.9 million), Brazil ($10.4 million), France and Algeria ($43 million), Germany ($53.9 million), Italy ($12.9 million), Japan ($109.9 million), Mexico ($12 million), Spain ($25 million), and the United Kingdom and Ireland ($81.9 million). Its overseas total was $493.2 million, taking its worldwide total to $924.3 million. At that time, the film was the third highest-grossing film in North America behind Titanic and Star Wars (1977), and the second highest-grossing film worldwide behind Titanic without adjusting for inflation of ticket prices. When adjusted for ticket price inflation, it ranked as the 19th-highest-grossing film domestically, making it the fourth Star Wars film to be in the Inflation-Adjusted Top 20.

After its 3D re-release in 2012, the worldwide box office gross exceeded $1 billion. Although in the intervening years, the film had lost some of its rankings in the lists of highest-grossing films, the 3D re-release returned it to the worldwide all-time Top 10 for several months. In North America, its revenues overtook those of the original Star Wars as the saga's highest-grossing film when not adjusting for inflation of ticket prices, and is the tenth highest-grossing film in North America . In North America, its ranking on the Adjusted for Ticket Price Inflation list climbed to 16th placeone place behind Return of the Jedi. The 3D , which premiered in February 2012, earned $43 million$22.5 million of which was in North Americaworldwide. The 3D re-release earned US$ worldwideincluding $43.5 million in North Americaand has increased the film's overall box office takings to $474.5 million domestically, and $552.5 million in other territories. The film's earnings exceeded $1 billion worldwide on February 22, 2012, making it the first Star Wars film and the 11th film in historyexcluding inflationto do so.

 Accolades The Phantom Menace was nominated for three Academy Awards: Best Sound Effects Editing, Best Visual Effects, and Best Sound (Gary Rydstrom, Tom Johnson, Shawn Murphy and John Midgley); all of which went to The Matrix. The film won Saturn Awards for Best Costumes and Best Special Effects, the MTV Movie Award for Best Action Scene, and a Young Artist Award for Jake Lloyd's performance. It was also nominated foramong othersthe BAFTAs for Visual Effects and Sound, and the Grammy Award for Best Score Soundtrack for Visual Media. The film did however receive seven Golden Raspberry Award (Razzie) nominations for Worst Picture, Worst Director, Worst Screenplay, Worst Supporting Actor (Jake Lloyd as Anakin), Worst Supporting Actress (Sofia Coppola as Saché), Worst Screen Couple (Jake Lloyd and Natalie Portman), and Jar Jar Binks actor Ahmed Best won the Worst Supporting Actor category.

The film was nominated Choice Drama Movie, Choice Movie Villain and Choice Summer Movie at 1999 Teen Choice Awards, but both lost to Cruel Intentions and Big Daddy, respectively.

 Legacy 

A sequel, Attack of the Clones, was released in 2002. The story continues a decade later with Anakin grown to adulthood, played by Hayden Christensen. A second sequel, Revenge of the Sith, was released in 2005.

A month after the film's release, "Weird Al" Yankovic released the parody song and music video "The Saga Begins", in which he interprets the film's plot from Obi-Wan's point of view to the tune of "American Pie"; this was included as a bonus feature on a 2011 Star Wars Blu-ray.

In a 2018 Saturday Night Live comedy rap video, Natalie Portman reprised her appearance as Queen Amidala from The Phantom Menace and defended the prequel trilogy.

Darth Maul's lightsaber-fighting style served as the inspiration for the 2003 viral video Star Wars Kid. Maul, who appears to die in The Phantom Menace, was resurrected for the animated series Star Wars: The Clone Wars, and he also appears in Star Wars Rebels and Solo: A Star Wars Story. In 2012, IGN named Maul the 16th-greatest Star Wars character. A similar weapon to his dual-bladed lightsaber appears in Star Wars: The Rise of Skywalker.

 Notes 

 References 

 Sources 

 
 
 
 
 
 

 Further reading 

Michael J. Hanson, Michael J. & Kay, Max S. (2000). Star Wars: The New Myth. Xlibris, 
McDonald, Paul F. (2013). The Star Wars Heresies: Interpreting The Themes, Symbols and Philosophies of Episodes I-III. McFarland, 
Bortolin, Matthew (2005). The Dharma of Star Wars''. Wisdom Publications,

External links 

  at StarWars.com
  at Lucasfilm.com
 
 
 
 Star Wars Episode I: The Phantom Menace at Corona's Coming Attractions

American science fiction action films
1990s science fiction action films
1990s science fiction adventure films
1999 films
1999 science fiction films
20th Century Fox films
3D re-releases
Alien invasions in films
American science fiction war films
Films about children
Films about elections
Films about slavery
Film and television memes
Films directed by George Lucas
Puppet films
Films produced by Rick McCallum
Films scored by John Williams
Films shot at Warner Bros. Studios, Leavesden
Films shot in Hertfordshire
Films shot in Italy
Films shot in Sydney
Films shot in Tunisia
Films with screenplays by George Lucas
Films with underwater settings
Films using motion capture
Golden Raspberry Award winning films
Lucasfilm films
Prequel films
Phantom Menace, The
 
Underwater civilizations in fiction
1990s English-language films
1990s American films
American prequel films